Corynotheca is a genus of herbs in the family Asphodelaceae, subfamily Hemerocallidoideae, first described as a genus in 1878. The entire genus is endemic to Australia.

Species
 Corynotheca asperata R.J.F.Hend - Western Australia, Northern Territory
 Corynotheca flexuosissima R.J.F.Hend. - Western Australia
 Corynotheca lateriflora (R.Br.) F.Muell. ex Benth. - Northern Territory
 Corynotheca licrota R.J.F.Hend. - Northern Territory, Queensland, New South Wales, Victoria, South Australia
 Corynotheca micrantha (Lindl.) Druce - Northern Territory, Queensland, Western Australia, South Australia
 Corynotheca pungens R.J.F.Hend. - Western Australia

References

Asphodelaceae genera
Hemerocallidoideae
Endemic flora of Australia